Azzouz Kara (born July 5, 1976) is a French retired professional footballer of Algerian descent.

Kara played at the professional level in Ligue 2 for FC Martigues.

1976 births
Living people
French footballers
Ligue 2 players
SC Toulon players
FC Martigues players
People from Martigues
French sportspeople of Algerian descent
SO Cassis Carnoux players
Marignane Gignac Côte Bleue FC players
Stade Beaucairois players
Association football midfielders
Sportspeople from Bouches-du-Rhône
Footballers from Provence-Alpes-Côte d'Azur